Peter Bruce Andrews (born 1937) is an American mathematician and Professor of Mathematics, Emeritus at Carnegie Mellon University in Pittsburgh, Pennsylvania, and the creator of the mathematical logic Q0. He received his Ph.D. from Princeton University in 1964 under the tutelage of Alonzo Church. He received the Herbrand Award in 2003. His research group designed the TPS automated theorem prover. A subsystem ETPS (Educational Theorem Proving System) of TPS is used to help students learn logic by interactively constructing natural deduction proofs.

Publications
Andrews, Peter B. (1965). A Transfinite Type Theory with Type Variables. North Holland Publishing Company, Amsterdam.
Andrews, Peter B. (1971). "Resolution in type theory". Journal of Symbolic Logic 36, 414–432.
Andrews, Peter B. (1981). "Theorem proving via general matings". J. Assoc. Comput. March. 28, no. 2, 193–214.
Andrews, Peter B. (1986). An introduction to mathematical logic and type theory: to truth through proof. Computer Science and Applied Mathematics. . Academic Press, Inc., Orlando, FL.
Andrews, Peter B. (1989). "On connections and higher-order logic". J. Automat. Reason. 5, no. 3, 257–291.
Andrews, Peter B.; Bishop, Matthew; Issar, Sunil; Nesmith, Dan; Pfenning, Frank; Xi, Hongwei (1996). "TPS: a theorem-proving system for classical type theory". J. Automat. Reason. 16, no. 3, 321–353.
Andrews, Peter B. (2002). An introduction to mathematical logic and type theory: to truth through proof. Second edition. Applied Logic Series, 27. . Kluwer Academic Publishers, Dordrecht.

References

External links
Peter B. Andrews

1937 births
Living people
20th-century American mathematicians
21st-century American mathematicians
American logicians
Mathematical logicians
Carnegie Mellon University faculty
Princeton University alumni